Prem Rakshith (born in 14 December 1977) is an Indian choreographer working predominantly in the Telugu cinema. He has won four Filmfare Awards.

Early life 
Prem Rakshith was born in Puducherry and raised in Chennai. His  real name is Thomas Satish, and he was actually born as a Hindu, before his grandmother got the entire family converted to Roman Catholic.

Career
Prem received acclaim for his work on "Naatu Naatu" from RRR (2022). The hook step involving N. T. Rama Rao Jr. and Ram Charan dancing together became popular. "Naatu Naatu" became the first song from an Indian film to win the Academy Award for Best Original Song. Rakshith was credited as a choreographer at the ceremony, where "Naatu Naatu" went on to win. It has also won the Best Original Song award at the 80th Golden Globe Awards, making it the first Asian as well as the first Indian song to win the award.

As choreographer

Awards and nominations

Msn

References

External links 

 

Living people
Filmfare Awards South winners
Indian film choreographers
1977 births
Dancers from Tamil Nadu
Artists from Chennai
21st-century Indian dancers
Santosham Film Awards winners
Indian Christians